Marcos Reyes ~ Marcos J. Reyes, born in 1960 in Bakersfield, California to parents from Chihuahua, Mexico, has been the Latin percussionist for the American progressive soul band War since 1998.

Career
Beginning by practicing on his brother's congas, Reyes taught himself by imitating what he heard on albums. He studied the art of Afro-Cuban drumming by studying with the National Folidoric group of Cuba and Los Angeles percussionist, Luis Conte.
Reyes joined War in 1998 and has been the Latin percussionist in the band since that time. 

Reyes has performed with Latin rock and performers such as Los Lobos, El Chicano, Malo, Tierra, Mento Buru, Abel Sanchez and Jorge Santana, as well as sharing the stage with Latin Jazz artists, Tito Puente, Dizzy Gillespie, Poncho Sanchez and Pete Escovedo. When War is not on tour, Reyes also works as a session musician. Outside of studio work, he teaches percussion privately, conducts percussion clinics for schools and music stores and leads his own band, Salsiology.

Personal life
A native of Lamont, California, Reyes currently resides in Bakersfield, CA. He owns and operates a hair salon.

External links 
 WAR ~ Band Website  
Marcos Reyes ~ Marcos Reyes Artist Website
https://www.facebook.com/marcosconqueros
https://twitter.com/congaartist
https://www.facebook.com/marcoshairandnails?ref=hl
From Lamont to the Latin Grammys!

1960 births
Living people
Musicians from Bakersfield, California
American percussionists
War (American band) members
Hispanic and Latino American musicians